Sheena Elise Chestnut Greitens (born November 23, 1982) is an American political scientist who is an associate professor in the Lyndon B. Johnson School of Public Affairs at the University of Texas at Austin. She was First Lady of Missouri from 2017 to 2018.

Education 
Greitens was raised in Spokane, Washington. Her father is a doctor who specializes in the treatment of sleep disorders and her mother is an oncologist. She earned a Bachelor of Arts degree from Stanford University, a Master of Philosophy from St Antony's College, Oxford as a Marshall Scholar, and a PhD from Harvard University.

Career 
Greitens' research focuses primarily on East Asia, American national security, and authoritarian politics and foreign policy. She is a Nonresident Senior Fellow at the Brookings Institution. Greitens has written op-ed articles on foreign relations and national security topics for RealClearPolitics, Foreign Policy, War on the Rocks, Foreign Affairs, The National Interest, The Washington Post, The New York Times, and others.

Personal life 
From 2011 to 2020, she was married to Missouri Governor Eric Greitens. They have two children.

References

External links

1982 births
21st-century American women
American political scientists
American women academics
American women political scientists
Brookings Institution people
First Ladies and Gentlemen of Missouri
Harvard University alumni
International relations scholars
Living people
University of Texas at Austin faculty